Yonatan "xSDTRK" Ayal (born September 27, in Montreal) is a Canadian writer, producer and artist. Starting with the piano at the age of three, xSDTRK studied at the Toronto Royal Conservatory, and has since moved on to become a multi-instrumentalist working in various musical genres.

Partial discography

Singles

Awards and nominations

References

External links
 

Canadian hip hop record producers
Canadian hip hop singers
1988 births
Living people
Ambient musicians
Canadian songwriters
Canadian industrial musicians
Canadian alternative rock musicians
21st-century Black Canadian male singers
Canadian people of Ethiopian descent
Musicians from Montreal
Writers from Montreal
Canadian male pianists
21st-century Canadian pianists